Virginia Frances Trioli  (born 16 August 1965) is an Australian journalist, author, radio and television presenter.

Trioli currently hosts the morning program on ABC Radio Melbourne in Melbourne. She has previously been co-host of the Australian Broadcasting Corporation's breakfast television program News Breakfast.

Career
Born in Bendigo, Trioli attended Donvale High School and graduated from La Trobe University in the 1980s with a Bachelor of Arts degree with a fine arts major in cinema. She worked as a publicist for a book publisher, then at the Victorian Ethnic Affairs Commission before starting at The Age in 1990. For three years she was president of The Age'''s chapter of the union, the Australian Journalists Association (now the Media, Entertainment and Arts Alliance).

Trioli began, but never completed, postgraduate studies at New York University from 1993 to 1994 while working as a reporter for The Age, where she worked until 1999. She worked part-time for the Packer organisation as a columnist on the magazine The Bulletin.

Trioli became a radio presenter when she worked at 774 ABC Melbourne in 2001 on weekday afternoons, where she shared the journalist union's Walkley Award with the 774 Drive Team. In 2001, she won a Walkley Award for her interview with former defence minister Peter Reith over the Children Overboard Affair.

In 2005, Trioli moved to Sydney to host the morning show on the radio station 702 ABC Sydney, replacing Sally Loane. After nearly two years, she resigned from this role on 9 November 2007 to concentrate on developing her TV career. In addition to her radio commitments, she was a regular occasional commentator on ABC TV program Insiders and was a weekly host on Sunday Arts. On 5 February 2007, Trioli was announced as the Friday presenter of ABC's Lateline news and current affairs program, replacing Maxine McKew. Trioli hosts the ABC program Q&A when its regular host, Hamish Macdonald, is on a break.

Trioli is the author of the book Generation F: Sex, Power and the Young Feminist published in 1996 as a riposte to Helen Garner's The First Stone.

In 2008, Trioli moved back to Melbourne to commence co-hosting News Breakfast alongside Barrie Cassidy, Joe O'Brien, Paul Kennedy and Vanessa O'Hanlon.

In January 2009, ABC announced that O'Brien would remain as host on Monday to Friday replacing Cassidy. In May 2010, O'Brien left News Breakfast to work as a news presenter on ABC News 24. He was replaced by Michael Rowland.

In May 2019, ABC announced that Trioli would be leaving News Breakfast to replace Jon Faine as Mornings presenter on ABC Radio Melbourne. Lisa Millar was announced as Trioli's replacement on News Breakfast.

On her first Mornings program with ABC Radio Melbourne, Trioli incorrectly declared herself to be the first female presenter of the program when in fact it had been Elizabeth Bond who had hosted the show in the late 1970s. Trioli apologised for the error. Ramona Koval had also hosted Mornings from 1988 to 1992.

Personal life
Trioli is married to Russell Skelton who is a contributing editor of The Age'' and head of the ABC's fact checking unit. The couple had their first child in 2012.

Awards
1995: Walkley Award
1999: Melbourne Press Club – "Best Columnist"
2001: Walkley Award

Bibliography

References

External links

1965 births
Living people
ABC News (Australia) presenters
Australian radio personalities
Australian women radio presenters
Australian people of Italian descent
La Trobe University alumni
Radio in Sydney
People from Bendigo
Walkley Award winners
Australian political journalists
Australian women journalists